Planetary Invasion is the fifth album released by R&B group Midnight Star. Released in 1984 and produced by group member Reggie Calloway, this album peaked at number seven on the R&B albums chart led by the number-one R&B single "Operator."  This single also scored the group their first (and to date, only) top-20 single on the pop charts, peaking at #18 in early 1985.

Track listing
"Body Snatchers"  (Reggie Calloway, Vincent Calloway, Melvin Gentry, Bill Simmons, Bo Watson)  6:55
"Scientific Love" (Calloway, Gentry, Kenneth Gant, Belinda Lipscomb, Watson)  6:19
"Let's Celebrate"  (Calloway, Jeff Cooper, Gentry, Lipscomb, Bobby Lovelace, Watson)  4:57
"Curious"  (Gentry, Lovelace, Watson)   4:19
"Planetary Invasion"  (Calloway, Calloway, Lovelace, Simmons, Watson)  6:10
"Operator"  (Calloway, Calloway, Lipscomb, Watson)  7:30
"Today My Love"  (Calloway, Watson)  4:59
"Can You Stay with Me"  (Calloway, Cooper, Lipscomb, Lovelace, Simmons, Watson)  4:03

Charts

Weekly charts

Year-end charts

Singles

References

External links
 Midnight Star-Planetary Invasion at Discogs

 

1984 albums
Midnight Star albums
SOLAR Records albums